Harriet Lindeman (born June 16, 1946) is a politician in the Åland Islands, an autonomous and unilingually Swedish territory of Finland.

 Minister of Social Affairs and Environment 2005-2007
 Second Deputy Speaker of the Lagting (Åland parliament) 2003-2005 
Minister of Social Affairs and Environment 1999-2001 
Minister of Education and Culture 1995-1999 
Vice lantråd (Deputy Premier) 1991-1995
Member of the Lagting (Åland parliament) 1987-1991

Lindeman, a nurse by profession, is one of the island group's most experienced politicians. She retired from national politics in 2007.

References
Åland parliament official biography 
 Worldwide Guide to Women in Leadership, Åland Islands entry
 Helsinki Commission, "Algae migrating northwards in Baltic", 14 Aug 2006

1946 births
Living people
Women government ministers of Åland
20th-century Finnish women politicians
21st-century Finnish women politicians